Eugenio Manuvakola was the leader of UNITA-Renovada, a breakaway faction of the UNITA political party in Angola. Manuvakola resigned from UNITA-Renovada's leadership in July 2002.

References

Living people
UNITA politicians
Year of birth missing (living people)
Place of birth missing (living people)